Junius is a self-titled compilation album by American art rock band Junius that compiles the Blood Is Bright EP and the Forcing Out the Silence EP into one collection. The album features remastered tracks from both EPs, while the CD and Vinyl formats include additional content such as expanded artwork, and lyrics.

Decoy Music included Junius in their "Most Anticipated Albums of 2007" list.

Release history
The compilation was initially released in North America on October 9, 2007 by Radar Recordings, and SAF Records.

To promote the release further, the band made their self-titled album available through European based record label Make My Day Records on February 8, 2008. The Make My Day Records release includes an alternate version of the front cover artwork and an exclusive bonus track titled "Lost in Basilica", a song that was recorded by the band during The Blood is Bright sessions.

Two years later, Junius was re-released in limited edition vinyl and digital download format via The Mylene Sheath on June 15, 2010 featuring new artwork. The vinyl release has since gone out-of-print.

Track listing

Personnel
Junius
Joseph E. Martinez - guitar, vocals
Michael Repasch-Nieves - guitar
Dave Soucy - bass (tracks 1-5)
Kieffer Infantino - bass (tracks 6-11)
Dana Filloon - drums
Production
Will Benoit - production
Nick Zampiello - mastering at New Alliance East in Cambridge, MA

References

External links

2007 compilation albums
Art rock compilation albums
Post-rock compilation albums
Junius (band) albums